The Institute of Linguistics of the Russian Academy of Sciences is a structural unit in the Language and Literature Section of History and Philology Department of the Russian Academy of Sciences. This Institute is one of the major centers in the field of linguistic research in Russia, and is also a center for the Moscow School of Comparative Linguistics.

Researchers of the Institute of Linguistics are involved in the study of fundamental linguistic problems as well as in applied linguistic studies of the languages of Russia, the Commonwealth of Independent States and foreign countries too. These include Romance, Germanic, Celtic, Iranian, Turkic, Mongolian, Finno-Ugriс languages and languages of the Caucasus region, Tropical Africa and South-Eastern Asia.

Great attention is paid to the problems of linguistic typology and comparative and historical linguistics. Much attention is given to the research of psycholinguistic and sociolinguistic problems (language situation, language policy, language conflicts) in different regions of the world.

History 

The Institute of Linguistics of the USSR Academy of Sciences was created in 1950 in Moscow after the so-called “discussion of linguistic issues” during the campaign against the Marrism (Japhetic theory). The Institute was organized on the basis of the Institute of the Russian Language of the Academy of Sciences, established in 1944, as a "counterweight" to the Marr Institute of Language and Mind in Leningrad, the leading center of theoretical language studies in the USSR of that period. The latter in 1952 was reorganized as the Leningrad branch of the Moscow Institute of Linguistics (this situation continued until 1991, when the Leningrad branch was transformed into an independent Institute for Linguistic Studies of the Russian Academy of Sciences).

The first Director of the Moscow Institute of Linguistics was Viktor Vinogradov, in 1954 this position was taken by his deputy, Аcademician Viktor Borkovskiy; Viktor Vinogradov became the Director of a renewed Institute of the Russian Language in 1958. Later Institute of Linguistics was headed by acad. Boris Serebrennikov (1960—1964), corr.-member Fedot Filin (1964—1968), corr.-member Viktoria Yartseva (1968—1977), acad. Georgiy Stepanov (1977—1986),  corr.-member Vadim Solntsev (1986—2000), corr.-member Viktor Vinogradov (2000—2012).

On June 19, 2012, Vladimir Alpatov became the Director of the Institute of Linguistics, as elected by general meeting of all the researchers of the Institute.

On May 25, 2017, Andrej Kibrik was elected the Director of the Institute of Linguistics by the general meeting of the researchers.

Administration 
The Institute is headed by the Direction: 
 Director of the Institute — Prof. Andrej Aleksandrovich Kibrik
 Deputy Director for science — Andrej Vladimirovich Sideltsev, PhD
 Deputy Director for science — Andrey Boleslavovich Shluinsky, PhD
 Deputy Director for general issues — Victor Nikolaevich Perley
 Scientific Secretary — Vladimir Ilyich Karpov, PhD

The Director also presides over the Scientific Council of the Institute.

Structure 
The structure of the scientific divisions of the Institute includes one Research Center, 8 Research Departments, the Department for international relations and the Department for the scientific personnel training. In 2002 the Department of Foreign Languages has been included in the structure of the Institute. In 2012 the Psycholinguistics Sector was transformed into the Department of Psycholinguistics comprising the General Psycholinguistics Sector and the Ethnopsycholinguistics Sector.

The Institute's subdivisions:

 Research center for national languages relations
 Department of Theoretical and Applied linguistics  
 Theoretical linguistics sector 
 Applied linguistics sector 
 Typology and Areal linguistics Department 
 Typology sector
 Areal linguistics sector
 Sector of General Comparative-Historical Studies
 Department of Experimental Speech Studies
 Department of Psycholinguistics
 general psycholinguistics sector
 sector of ethnopsycholinguistics
 Department of Indo-European Languages
 sector of Germanic languages
 sector of Romance languages
 sector of Iranian languages
 group of Anatolian and Celtic languages
 Department of Uralic and Altaic Languages
 sector of Finno-Ugric languages
 Department of Caucasian Languages
 group "Linguistic Atlas of Europe"
 Department of Southeast Asian Languages 
 Department of African Languages
 Department of Foreign Languages
 Department for Scientific Personnel Training

There are also a secretariat, an administrative and management apparatus and an economic department.

Directions of scientific research 

The Institute’s directions of research include:
 Theory of language, linguistic typology and comparative-historical linguistics;
 Description of the languages of the world, including rare and endangered languages;
 Areal linguistics;
 Sociolinguistics;
 Ethnolinguistics;
 Psycholinguistics;
 History of literary languages;
 Computational linguistics;
 Lexicography;
 Logical analysis of the language;
 Experimental phonetics and semantics;
 Translation theory.

Projects 

Researchers of the Institute are involved in the preparation of a multi-volume encyclopaedia "Languages of the World" (14 volumes have already been published). A three-volume encyclopaedia of the languages of Russia and the ex-USSR countries has been published.

Joint international research is conducted in cooperation with scientific institutions of France, the USA, Canada, Spain, Germany, Vietnam and other countries.

The Institute provides practical assistance in the development of literary oral and writing norms for rare and revitalized languages (for example, the Saami language).

Scientists of the Institute of Linguistics of the Russian Academy of Sciences have created the "Linguistic Encyclopedic Dictionary", the first edition of which was published in 1990 with Viktoria Yartseva as the chief editor (the 2nd edition, 2002). In 1995, the main authors and editors of this encyclopaedia were awarded the State Prize in the field of science and technology.

See also
Institute for Linguistic Studies
Moscow School of Comparative Linguistics
Evolution of Human Languages

References

External links
 Official website 
 About the Institute of Linguistics, on the R.A.S. website 

Research institutes in Russia
Linguistic research institutes
Research institutes in the Soviet Union
Institutes of the Russian Academy of Sciences